A Treatise on the Astrolabe is a medieval instruction manual on the astrolabe by Geoffrey Chaucer.  It describes both the form and the proper use of the instrument, and stands out as a prose technical work from a writer better known for poetry, written in English rather than the more typical Latin.

Significance

The Treatise is considered the "oldest work in English written upon an elaborate scientific instrument".  It is admired for its clarity in explaining difficult concepts – although modern readers lacking an actual astrolabe may find the details of the astrolabe difficult to understand.  Robinson believes that it indicates that had Chaucer written more freely composed prose it would have been superior to his translations of Boethius and Renaut de Louhans.

Chaucer’s exact source is undetermined but most of his ‘conclusions’ go back, directly or indirectly, to Compositio et Operatio Astrolabii, a Latin translation of Messahala's Arabic treatise of the 8th century.  His description of the instrument amplifies Messahala’s, and Chaucer’s indebtedness to Messahala was recognised by John Selden and established by Walter William Skeat. Mark Harvey Liddell held Chaucer drew on De Sphaera of John de Sacrobosco for the substance of his astronomical definitions and descriptions, but the non-correspondence in language suggests the probable use of an alternative compilation.  A collotype facsimile of the second part of the Latin text of Messahala (the portion which is parallel to Chaucer's) is found in Skeat’s Treatise On The Astrolabe. and in Gunther's Chaucer and Messahalla on the Astrolabe.

Paul Kunitzsch argued that the treatise on the astrolabe long attributed to Messahala was in fact written by Ibn al-Saffar.

Language

The work is written in free-flowing English of that time (1391), today commonly referred to as middle English. Chaucer explains this departure from the norm thus:
"This treatis, ..., wol I shewe the ... in Englissh, for Latyn ne canst thou yit but small"

Chaucer proceeds to labour the point somewhat:
"Grekes ... in Grek; and to Arabiens in Arabik, and to Jewes in Ebrew, and to Latyn folk in Latyn; whiche Latyn folk had hem [conclusions] first out of othere dyverse languages, and writtem hem in her owne tunge, that is to seyn, in Latyn.".

He continues to explain that it easier for a child to understand things in his own language than struggle with unfamiliar grammar, a commonplace idea today but radical in the fourteenth century. Finally, he appeals to Royalty  (his wife was a lady-in-waiting to Edward III's queen and sister to John of Gaunt's wife) in an early version of the phrase "the King's English":
"And preie God save the King, that is lord of this language, ..."

Manuscripts
Skeat identifies 22 manuscripts of varying quality.  The best he labels A, B and C which are MS. Dd. 3.53 (part 2) in the Cambridge University Library,  MS. E Museo 54 in the Bodleian Library and MS. Rawlinson, Misc. 1262 also in the Bodleian.  A and B were apparently written by the same scribe, but A has been corrected by another hand.  Skeat observes that the errors are just those described in "Chaucers Wordes unto Adam, His Owne Scriveyn": 
"So ofte a-daye I mot thy werk renewe,
"It to correcte and eek to rubbe and scrape;
"And al is thorough thy negligence and rape."

A has indeed been rubbed and scraped then corrected by another hand.  This latter scribe Skeat believes to be a better writer than the first.  To this second writer was the insertion of diagrams entrusted.  A and B were apparently written in London about the year 1400, that is some 9 years after the original composition.  Manuscript C is also early, perhaps 1420 and closely agrees with A.

Audience

Chaucer opens with the words "Lyte Lowys my sone".  In the past a question arose whether the Lowys was Chaucer's son or some other child he was in close contact with.  Kittredge suggested that it could be Lewis Clifford, a son of a friend and possible a godson of Chaucer's.  As evidence he advanced that Lewis Clifford died in October 1391, the year of the composition, which could explain its abandonment.  Robinson reports though the finding of a document by Professor Manly "recently" (to 1957) which links one Lewis Chaucer with Geoffrey's eldest child Thomas Chaucer.  The likelihood therefore is that the dedication can be taken at face value.

Chaucer had an eye to the wider public as well.  In the prologue he says:
Now wol I preie mekely every discret persone that redith or herith this litel tretys..."

Structure
The work was planned to have an introduction and five sections:
A description of the astrolabe
A rudimentary course in using the instrument
Various tables of longitudes, latitudes, declinations, etc.
A "theorike" (theory) of the motion of the celestial bodies, in particular a table showing the "very moving of the moon"
An introduction to the broader field of "astrologie," a word which at the time referred to the entire span of what we now divide into astrology and astronomy.

Part 1 is complete and extant.  Part 2 is also extant with certain caveats described below.  Part 3, if it ever existed, is not extant as part of the Treatise.  Part 4 was, in the opinion of Skeat, probably never written.  Part 5 also was probably never written which Skeat approves of.  Indeed, he draws attention to Chaucer's comment at the end of conclusion 4:
"Natheles these ben observaunces of judicial matere and rytes of payens, in whiche my spirit hath no feith, no knowing of her horoscopum."

Part 1

The whole of this section describes the form of an astrolabe.  The astrolabe is based on a large plate ("The moder" or "mother") which is arranged to hang vertically from a thumb ring.  It has "a large hool, that resceiveth in hir wombe the thin plates".  The back of the astrolabe is engraved with various scales (see Skeat's sketch below).  Mounted on the back is a sighting rule (Skeat's fig 3, below) "a brod rule, that hath on either end a square plate perced with certein holes".  To hold it all together there is a "pyn" with a "littel wegge" (wedge) as shown below at Skeat's fig 7.  Into the "womb" various thin plates can be inserted which are designed for a particular place: "compowned after the latitude of Oxenforde".  These plates show the star map.  Surmounting them is a "riet" or "rete" which is a pierced framework carrying the major stars shown at fig 9.  Outside all is another rule, this time not with sighting holes, mounted on the common pivot, see fig 6.

Part 2
Part 2 consists of around 40 propositions or descriptions of things that can be done with the astrolabe.  The exact number is uncertain since of the later propositions some are of disputed or doubtful authenticity.  Skeat accepts that propositions 1-40 are unambiguously genuine.  Robinson generally follows Skeat's reasoning.  These first 40 propositions form the canon of part 2; the propositions that follow are usually labeled "Supplementary Propositions."

The astrolabe

The astrolabe was a sophisticated precision instrument.  With it one could determine the date, time (when the sky was clear), the position of stars, the passage of the zodiac, latitude on the earth's surface, tides and basic surveying.  Care must be taken not to dismiss the astrological aspects; as well as any mystical interpretation astrological terminology was used for what today would be recognized as astronomy.  Determining when the sun entered a house (or sign) of the zodiac was a precise determination of the calendar.

Skeat produced a number of sketches to accompany his edition:

The stars listed on the rim of the rete of the drawings in the Treatise are given below with their modern names:

See also
The equatorie of the planetis by John Westwyk

References
Footnotes

Citations

Bibliography

  quoted by 
 
 
 
 
  5th impression.  Originally published by Houghton Mifflin Co, Boston, Mass.

External links

 Plain-text format (with line numbering): Part 1 Part 2
from eChaucer
 The text of A Treatise on the Astrolabe – presented in Middle English and Modern English side-by-side.
A Treatise on the Astrolabe - a verb database (language analysis, description of the astrolabe and Middle English period)

Medieval literature
History of astronomy
Astronomy books
Astrological texts
Works by Geoffrey Chaucer
14th-century books
Treatises